Maccabi Hadera  is an Israeli basketball team from the town of Hadera, Israel and competes in Liga Artzit The club played in the Israeli Basketball Premier League in the 2000-2001 season.

Notable players
Or Goren

References

Basketball teams in Israel